Preethi Varma is an Indian actress, known for her work in Tamil cinema. In the 2000s, she played lead roles in mid-budget Indian films.

Career
After making her debut in a supporting role in the Sathyaraj-starrer Maaran (2002), Preethi portrayed over 15 lead roles in Tamil and Telugu language films throughout the mid to late 2000s. Notably, she appeared alongside S. J. Suryah in Thirumagan (2007), portraying a rural belle.

Personal life
Preethi Varma was born to Bharath Kumar and Ramya. In February 2007, Preethi Varma garnered coverage in the media for eloping from home in Rajamundry to move in with her boyfriend in Mumbai. Her parents filed a missing person complaint, with Preethi later clarifying that she had not been abducted and was safe elsewhere. In return, she filed a complaint against her parents for allegedly attempting to push her into prostitution. She later reconciled with her parents.

During the period, she was working on 18 Vayasu Puyale (2007), which had a similar scene for Preethi of escaping home with her boyfriend against her parents' wishes.

Filmography

References

External links
 

Indian film actresses
Actresses in Malayalam cinema
Living people
Actresses in Telugu cinema
Actresses in Tamil cinema
Actresses in Kannada cinema
21st-century Indian actresses
20th-century Indian actresses
Actresses in Telugu television
Tamil actresses